Sheikh Maktoum bin Rashid Al Maktoum (15 August 1943 – 4 January 2006) was an Emirati politician who served as the vice president and prime minister of the United Arab Emirates (UAE) as well as the Ruler of Dubai. He was initially prime minister of the UAE from 1971 to 1979, and as Ruler of Dubai from 1990 to 2006.

Maktoum held the role of the United Arab Emirates's first Prime Minister and Vice President. He was succeeded after his death by his brother Sheikh Mohammed as Ruler of Dubai.

Early life 
He was born in 1943 in Al Shindagha, Dubai to the Al Maktoum family of the Al Bu Falasah tribe.

Political career
His father Sheikh Rashid bin Saeed Al Maktoum became the Ruler of Dubai upon the death of his own father, Sheikh Saeed bin Maktoum bin Hasher Al Maktoum (Saeed II), in 1958. Sheikh Maktoum was Prime Minister of the United Arab Emirates first from the country's independence on 2 December 1971 until 25 April 1979, when he was replaced by his father, who had been Vice President since 1971. Following his father's death on 7 October 1990, he resumed his position as Prime Minister of the United Arab Emirates, and also took over as Ruler of Dubai and Vice President of the United Arab Emirates. He served in all three positions until his death on 4 January 2006.

Sheikh Maktoum also briefly served as acting President of the United Arab Emirates on 2–3 November 2004 between the death of Sheikh Zayed bin Sultan Al Nahyan and the proclamation and installation of his son Sheikh Khalifa bin Zayed Al Nahyan as President of the United Arab Emirates on 4 November 2004.

Sheikh Maktoum ran the emirate of Dubai along with his two brothers, Sheikh Mohammed (Crown Prince and Minister of Defense) and Sheikh Hamdan (Minister of Finance) of the United Arab Emirates. Internationally, he was also known as co-owner (with his brothers) of Dubai's Godolphin Stables, which competes in major horse races around the world.

Death
Sheikh Maktoum bin Rashid al Maktoum died on the morning of 4 January 2006, suffering a heart attack while staying at Palazzo Versace Hotel in Gold Coast, Queensland, Australia. He was succeeded by his brother, Sheikh Mohammed bin Rashid Al Maktoum, as ruler of Dubai.  His body was brought back from Australia and buried in Dubai.

Personal life

Sheikha Alia bint Khalifa Al Maktoum was Al Maktoum's wife until his death in 2006. They married on 12 March 1971. Sheikha Alia, like other members of the Maktoum family, is involved in horse racing. 

One of Al Maktoum's daughters with Alia bint Khalifa bin Saeed Al Maktoum, is Lateefa bint Maktoum Al Maktoum (born 11 February 1985). She has kept her life very private after her kidnapping following her wedding into the Al Nahyan family. Sheikha Lateefa bint Maktoum is the founder of the art center Tashkeel Dubai. Sheikha Alia's other children are Sheikha Hessa, Sheikha Maitha, Sheikh Saeed and Sheikh Rashid (1979-2002).   

Sheikha Bouchra bint Mohammed was Al Maktoum's second wife and had three sons named Sheikh Mohammed, Hamdan and Zayed with him. She was a hobbyist painter and a horse racing enthusiast.

Ancestry

See also
 Timeline of Dubai
 List of national leaders

References

Notes

External links
Official web page of HH Sheikh Maktoum bin Rashid Al Maktoum
Obituary: Sheikh Maktoum BBC
Shaikh Maktoum Bin Rashid Al Maktoum dies Gulf News

1941 births
2006 deaths
Emirati politicians
Maktoum bin Rashid Al Maktoum
Prime Ministers of the United Arab Emirates
Presidents of the United Arab Emirates
Government ministers of the United Arab Emirates
Emirati racehorse owners and breeders
Rulers of Dubai
20th-century Emirati people